Mucilaginibacter polysacchareus is a Gram-negative, aerobic and non-motile bacterium from the genus of Mucilaginibacter which has been isolated from the rhizoplane of the plant Angelica sinensis in Geumsan in Korea. Mucilaginibacter polysacchareus produces exopolysaccharide.

References

External links
Type strain of Mucilaginibacter polysacchareus at BacDive -  the Bacterial Diversity Metadatabase

Sphingobacteriia
Bacteria described in 2012